"America's the Word for You and Me" is a World War I song written  composed by Jacob J. Tanner Jr. The song was published in 1918 by Jacob J. Tanner Jr., in Pittsburgh, Pennsylvania. The sheet music cover depicts a photo of President Wilson and the head of Uncle Sam with an inset of George Washington.

The sheet music can be found at the Pritzker Military Museum & Library.

References

Bibliography
Parker, Bernard S. World War I Sheet Music 1. Jefferson: McFarland & Company, Inc., 2007. . 
Vogel, Frederick G. World War I Songs: A History and Dictionary of Popular American Patriotic Tunes, with Over 300 Complete Lyrics. Jefferson: McFarland & Company, Inc., 1995. . 

Songs about the United States
1918 songs
Songs of World War I